Damalinia is a genus of lice belonging to the family Trichodectidae.

Synonyms:
 Cervicola Kéler, 1934
 Tragulicola Lyal, 1985

Species:
 Damalinia adenota (Bedford, 1936) 
 Damalinia appendiculata (Piaget, 1880) 
 Damalinia baxi Hopkins, 1947

References

Lice